Aïshti is a Lebanese luxury department chain store which sells fashion and clothing. In 2015, Aïshti opened the Aïshti Foundation in Beirut. The building was designed by architect David Adjaye "with a facade of red ceramic tiles, combining a high-end mall and a separate exhibition space." and interiors by Christian Lahoude Studio. The foundation building will showcase works from Aïshti CEO Tony Salamé's 2,000-strong personal art collection as well as a variety of high end luxury retail shops. The building took three years to complete.

Opened by Tony Salamé in 1989, Aïshti has grown from a single high-end clothing store into a chain with various branches throughout Lebanon, selling luxury brands including Prada, Miu Miu, Yves Saint Laurent, Dolce & Gabbana, Dior, Sergio Rossi, Roberto Cavalli, Marc Jacobs, Marni, Burberry, Fendi, Chloé and others.

The company's advertising is managed by New York-based firm Sagmeister & Walsh. They most recently produced the "By the Sea" campaign on the occasion of the opening of the Aïshti Foundation, which is located along the Mediterranean Sea.

Aïshti also owns and operates several monobrand boutiques, most notably Cartier, Gucci, Burberry, Fendi, Marc Jacobs, Dolce & Gabbana, Dior, Balenciaga, Bottega Veneta, Yves Saint Laurent, Canali, Corneliani, Etro, Roberto Cavalli, Chloe, Jimmy Choo, Stella McCartney, Celine, Ermenegildo Zegna, 7 For All Mankind, Camper, Diesel, Agent Provocateur, Emilio Pucci, Façonnable, The Kooples, Tory Burch, True Religion and Valentino in Lebanon.

Aïzone, marketed as the more casual side of Aïshti, exists as a separate entity and carries some of the international brands including Camper, True Religion, 7 for All Mankind, Armani Jeans and various other Los Angeles brands.

The company has also branched out into parallel industries, with a spa and hair salon operating inside the Aïshti store in Downtown Beirut, and a lifestyle publication, ''A Magazine," focusing on fashion, entertainment and design. The company also operates "L'Officiel Levant," a local offshoot of "L'Officiel Paris."

The restaurants, "People,"with two separate locations, Faqra and Downtown & "ART People" in Antelias, Aïshti by the Sea also operate under the Aïshti umbrella.

Aïshti Foundation 
The Aïshti Foundation is a 350,000-square-foot mixed art gallery and retail space located north of Beirut in Jal el Dib, Lebanon. The Aishti Foundation was constructed on behalf of Aishti CEO Tony Salamé, and designed by architect David Adjaye.  
The cost of construction is estimated to be over $100 million.

The gallery space is over 40,000 square feet.  The art space hosts selections from Tony and Elham Salamé’s personal collection.

The inaugural exhibition, entitled “New Skin,” was curated by Massimiliano Gioni and features work from notable artists such as Alice Channer, Sterling Ruby and Danh Voh, as well as figures from the Arte Povera movement such as Giuseppe Penone.

Aïshti by the Sea 
Aïshti by the Sea includes luxury brands such as Alexander McQueen, Proenza Schouler, Alaia, Sonia Rykiel, Tory Burch, Loewe, Marc Jacobs, Pal Zileri, Alberta Ferretti, with more than 90 in total. The mall also features the Art People restaurant.

Tony Salamé 
Tony Salamé is a Lebanese Italian businessman and art collector, as well as the CEO and Chairman of Aishti. 
Salamé opened the first Aishti store in 1989. In 1995, he built Aishti into Lebanon’s foremost luxury department store with a flagship store in Beirut’s Downtown Souks, with affiliated mono-brand boutiques surrounding it – such as Cartier, Dior and Dolce & Gabbana.

Italian Order of Merit
In March 2015 Salamé was awarded the Order of Merit of the Italian Republic, Italy's highest honor, by the Italian Embassy in Beirut at an event attended by diplomats, business partners and family.

Art collection 
Salamé owns around 2,500 works by over 150 artists. He works closely with New York art dealer Jeffrey Deitch, and began buying art in 2003, first acquiring Arte Povera works by Penone, Lucio Fontana and others. Around 200 works were selected for the opening show entitled New Skin, curated by Massimiliano Gioni.

According to Gioni, the associate director and director of exhibitions at the New Museum in New York, there has been “a sudden acceleration of the [Salamé] collection in the past ten years." 
The main focus of his collection is 21st century art.

Personal life
He is married to Elham Salamé; they have four children: Tasha, Giorgio, Sandro and Mateo. He speaks fluent French, English, Arabic and Italian.

References

External links
Aïshti

Department stores of Lebanon
Retail companies of Lebanon